The London School of Journalism (LSJ) is an independent journalism school based in London, England, which offers qualifications in journalism, freelance journalism and creative writing. The LSJ provides both on-site and distance learning to its students, ranging from short courses to postgraduate diplomas. The school was founded in 1920 by Sir Max Pemberton.

Notable alumni
Josie d'Arby, actress and television presenter
Don Charlwood, Australian writer
Gina Din, businesswoman
Can Dundar, journalist, columnist and documentarian
Charles Graves, journalist and author
William Harris, journalist
Georgios Karatzaferis, Greek politician and member of the Hellenic Parliament
Neil Nunes, BBC Radio 4 announcer
T. Selva, author, columnist, radio and television personality
Noel 'Razor' Smith, career criminal and writer
Rajesh Talwar, Indian author
Jill Townsend, American actress, journalist (Daily Mail)
Larissa Vassilian, journalist
Ras Mubarak, Ghanaian journalist and politician
Oral Ofori, journalist, digital storyteller
Michael Ernest Sweet, educator, writer
Varghese Paul, Indian journalist, writer

References

External links

 
Journalism schools in the United Kingdom
Education in London
Universities and colleges in London
Educational institutions established in 1920
1920 establishments in England
Distance education institutions based in the United Kingdom